I Love India is a 1993 Indian Tamil-language action film directed by Pavithran. The film stars Sarath Kumar, débutante Tisca Chopra and Shenbagam. It was released on 14 October 1993.

Plot 

Diwakar, an Indian Brigadier, is charged to eradicate terrorism in Kashmir. Diwakar lives with his sister Anu. His neighbour Priya falls in love with him. One day, the terrorists kidnap Anu and they kill her thereafter. In the past, Diwakar promised Anu to marry Priya. To fulfil his sister's wish, Diwakar eventually marries Priya. But Diwakar cannot live happily as long as he does not eliminate the terrorists.

Cast 

Sarath Kumar as Brigadier Diwakar
Tisca Chopra as Priya
Shenbagam as Anu
Manorama as Priya's mother
Goundamani as Diwakar's uncle
Puneet Issar
Babu Antony
C. S. Rao as Rao
Kalidoss as Rosario
Ramachandran
Prasanth
Jaya Prahasam
John Babu in a special appearance
Pallavi in a special appearance in a song
Yamuna in a special appearance in a song
Meeta Gupta in a special appearance in a song
Shagufta Ali in a special appearance in a song
Kavithasri in a special appearance in a song

Production 
After scoring back-to-back successes like Vasanthakala Paravai (1991) and Surieyan (1992), producer K. T. Kunjumon of A. R. S. Film International wanted to collaborate again with director Pavithran and actor R. Sarathkumar; they started a project called India Today. However Kunjumon left the project due to creative differences with Pavithran, the project was taken over by a different production house and underwent a change of title: I Love India.

Soundtrack 
The soundtrack was composed by Ilaiyaraaja, with lyrics written by Vaali.

Release and reception 
I Love India was released on 14 October 1993. A critic from Indolink noted, "Pavithran's direction lacks direction" and that "the only saving grace is the music of Illayaraja ; a couple of songs are really melodious and lilting tunes, and the background music is commendable, as is the photography of Ashok Kumar and the editing skills of Lenin and Vijayan". He added that the film is "technically well made and lavishly mounted, but fails to grip the viewer in any way." R. P. R. of Kalki wrote that Pavithran made an omlette out of basic ingredients like Tamil culture, Indian culture and patriotism.

References

External links 

1990s Tamil-language films
1993 action films
1993 films
Films about terrorism in India
Films scored by Ilaiyaraaja
Films set in Jammu and Kashmir
Films set in Rajasthan
Indian action films
Indian Army in films
Kashmir conflict in films